Edward Telleria (born 1974) is an artist from the Dominican Republic, known for his paintings of eyes, horses and roses.

Early life and education
He was born in Santo Domingo, Dominican Republic.

Telleria received a Bachelor of Fine Arts in 1994 and a Master of Fine Arts in 1996 from the Escuela Nacional de Bellas Artes in Santo Domingo, Dominican Republic.

Career
Telleria enrolled in La Escuela Nacional de Bellas Artes in Santo Domingo at the age of 15. During his time at La Escuela Nacional de Bellas Artes he won first prize for painting, the highest honor, two years in a row.

Edward has had a prolific career for an artist of his age.  In the past twelve years, he has had eight solo shows, both in the Dominican Republic and in the United States.

Edward has been showing his work in the United States since 2007 at Cortile Gallery in Provincetown, MA.  He had a solo show at the Cortile Gallery in September 2007.  Edward participated in a collective exhibition at Brookline Arts Center in March 2009 and appeared on the front page of the Lifestyle/Arts section of the Brookline Tab as a result of the event.  Edward's work is also shown at Mesa Fine Art in the Dominican Republic.

Edward has received various awards for his painting in the Dominican Republic. His artwork is included in the Dominican Encyclopedia of Plastic and Visual Artists.

Exhibitions

Solo
 1997 Benetton Café, Plaza Central. "Deseos" ("Desires"). Santo Domingo, Dominican Republic.
 1997 National School of Fine Arts (ENBA). "Reflejos del Alma" ("Reflections of the Soul"). Santo Domingo, Dominican Republic.
 2000 Dominican School of Artistas Plásticos (CODAP). "Solo Para Pensadores" ("Only for Thinkers"). Santo Domingo, Dominican Republic.
 2001 Palma Cana. "Edward Telleria". Santo Domingo, Dominican Republic.
 2002 Collage Bar. "Edward Telleria". Santo Domingo, Dominican Republic.
 2004 Museo del Hombre Dominicano. "Experiencia Taina" ("Taina Experience"). 31 Anniversary. Santo Domingo, Dominican Republic.
 2006 Museo de las Casas Reales. "En Homenaje al Ego" ("Tribute to the Ego"). Santo Domingo, Dominican Republic.
 2007 Cortile Gallery. Provincetown, Massachusetts, United States.
 2008 Funglode. "Bestias y Rosas" ("Beasts and Roses"). Santo Domingo, Dominican Republic.
 2010 Mesa Fine Art. "La pasion del alma" ("The Passion of Alma"). Santo Domingo, Dominican Republic.
 2013 Gallery 360, Northeastern University, ("Identidad Caribeña"), Boston, MA USA.
 2015 Mesa Fine Art. "Dragon Flowers". Santo Domingo, Dominican Republic.

Group
 1990–1996 National School of Fine Arts, end of year exposition (ENBA). Santo Domingo, Dominican Republic.
 1998 Creative Workshop for Young Artists. "Calle Arte 98". Santo Domingo, Dominican Republic.
 1998 XXI National Biennial of Visual Arts. Santo Domingo, Dominican Republic.
 1999 Festival of Total Art. Jarabacoa, Dominican Republic.
 2000 Footprints of Dominican Artistas Palsticos, permanent mural, Ala Justo Susana. Museo del Hombre. Santo Domingo, Dominican Republic.
 2000 Foundation Guayasamín. Quito, Ecuador
 2000 United Nations; ALAI Afrocimarron. Festival of the Caribbean of Santiago of Cuba. Cuba.
 2000 Wild African Perception, UNESCO. Santo Domingo, Dominican Republic.
 2002 Classic Caribbean Art Gallery+Studio. Erosxwek Nanosmek. Curaçao.
 2002 "Compositions". 10 Dominican Artists. Curaçao.
 2002 "Determinant". Exhibition Parallel, IV Biennial of the Caribbean (CODAP). Santo Domingo, Dominican Republic.
 2002 "Pinta La Paz" Painting of the Américas, Casa de Teatro. Santo Domingo, Dominican Republic.
 2003 Collective Exhibition "Tribute to Milan Suero and Ramon Oviedo". Dominican School of Artistas Plásticos (CODAP). Santo Domingo, Dominican Republic.
 2003 "The Space between Artistas Plasticos". Forum Pedro Mir, Libreria Cuesta. Santo Domingo, Dominican Republic.
 2004 Collective "Tribute to Candido Bidó and Guillo Perez". Museum of the Dominican Family of Century XIX, House of Toasting. Santo Domingo, Dominican Republic.
 2004 Encuentro de Artistas Plasticos. Factory of Art Ramon Sandoval. Santo Domingo, DominIcan Republic.
 2004 "Glances", Selection of Honor. Santo Domingo, Dominican Republic.
 2004 Joint Line of Vision of Contemporary Art "Long Play". House of UNESCO. Santo Domingo, Dominican Republic.
 2005 Encuentro de Artistas "Foundation Almonte". Santo Domingo, Dominican Republic.
 2005 International Traveling Exposition, Francisco Nader, Latin American Art. Santo Domingo, Dominican Republic.
 2008–2009 Brookline Arts Center. "Minot Rose Garden Exhibition". Brookline, Massachusetts, United States.
 2008 Cortile Gallery. Provincetown, Massachusetts, United States.
 2010  Centro Cultural de la Raza. "Matices de las Americas". San Diego, California, United States.

Public auctions
 2007 Painting auctioned and sold at the Junior League of Boston Annual Charity Ball. Boston, Massachusetts, United States.
 2009 Painting auctioned at Massachusetts Society for the Prevention of Cruelty to Children. Boston, Massachusetts, United States.

Collections
 Museo de Arte Moderno, Santo Domingo, Dominican Republic
 Museo de las Casas Reales, Santo Domingo, Dominican Republic
 Museo del Hombre Dominicano, Santo Domingo, Dominican Republic
 Dominican Embassy, Jamaica

Affiliations
1999–2001 President, Dominican School of Artistas Plásticos (CODAP). Santo Domingo, Dominican Republic.
2002–2004 Vice President, Dominican School of Artistas Plásticos (CODAP). Santo Domingo, Dominican Republic.
2004 Member, Association the International of Artistas Plásticos (AIAP) UNESCO. Santo Domingo, Dominican Republic.
2005 Advisor to President of the Dominican School of Artistas Plásticos (CODAP). Santo Domingo, Dominican Republic.

References

 Geron, Candido. Enciclopedia de las artes plasticas dominicanas, 1844–2000. Santo Domingo, Dominican Republic.
 Jiménez, Marianela.  "Reflection of the Soul in the Painting of Edward Telleria". Santo Domingo, Dominican Republic.
 Liviano, Cristina (1997).  "Desire".  La Nacion. Santo Domingo, Dominican Republic.
 Perez, Lepoldo (1997). "The Painting of Edward Telleria". Santo Domingo, Dominican Republic.
 Ramos, Orlando.  "Reflection of the Soul". El Siglo.  Santo Domingo, Dominican Republic.
 Silvestre, Clara. "An Artist with Great Responsibilities". Hoy. Santo Domingo, Dominican Republic.
 "How Does Your Garden Grow?" Brookline Tab. March 5, 2009.
 ArtScope Magazine Boston. March–April 2009.
 El Caribe (newspaper). Santo Domingo, Dominican Republic.
 El Nacional (newspaper). Santo Domingo, Dominican Republic.
 El Punto (magazine). Casa de Teatro. Santo Domingo, Dominican Republic.
 Hoy (newspaper). Santo Domingo, Dominican Republic.
 Listin Diario (newspaper). Santo Domingo, Dominican Republic. July 27, 2006.
 Provincetown Banner (newspaper). September 20, 2007.
 "Listin Diario" (newspaper). November 17, 2013 —  Una relacion de amor y odio. Santo Domingo 

Date of birth missing (living people)
1974 births
20th-century Dominican Republic painters
Male painters
21st-century Dominican Republic artists
20th-century Dominican Republic artists
21st-century Dominican Republic people
Flower artists
Living people
People from Santo Domingo
21st-century painters
20th-century male artists
21st-century male artists